Herman Roderick Volz (1904–1990) was a Swiss-American painter, muralist, lithographer, set designer, decorative artist and ceramist. He was politically active, vocal and often made social statements through his imagery and he was especially taken by the industrial horizon of his adopted home of San Francisco Bay Area. Many of his art pieces done for the Federal Art Project (FAP), for example, were of men at work and of docks, piers, and railroad yards.

Biography
Herman Roderick Volz was born December 25, 1904, in Zürich, Switzerland. His first training was under the tutelage of his grandfather, a master in decorative arts. He then started his formal training at the Art und Gewerbeschule in Zürich, the Academy of Fine Art in Vienna, and travelled for four years in France, Spain, Italy, Africa and Holland, eventually moving to the San Francisco Bay Area in 1933. By 1938 he became a US citizen.

Early work 
During the Great Depression, Volz was appointed to the position of supervisor in the Northern California Art Project and supervisor for the Federal Building mural project at the Golden Gate International Exposition (GGIE).  He painted the two large murals on the front panels of Timothy Pflueger's Federal Building, entitled "The Conquest of the West by Land" and "The Conquest of the West by Sea." The two-part mural measured sixty feet by one-hundred sixty feet. Volz's assistants included Jose Ramis, John Saccaro, John Thomas Hayes (Tom Hayes), Carlton Williams, Peter Lowe, Percy Freer, Robert P. McChesney, Alden Clark and Ernest Lenshaw. Volz created two large, 50′ x 45′ low-relief polished marble mosaic panels, representing organic science and inorganic science, as part of "Art in Action" at the Golden Gate International Exposition in 1940. These were later installed at San Francisco City College.  The two mosaic panels took two years to install with a staff of eight workmen, Juan Breda served as assistant mosaicist for the project. The murals are named Organic and Inorganic Science. The imagery of the mosaics represent fields such as physics, chemistry, biology, and mathematics with text accompanying the mural that reads ‘Give me a base and I move the world.’

Later work 
From 1944 to 1948 he worked in Hollywood, as a scenic artist and technical director at Actors' Laboratory Theatre and he designed sets for MGM and Paramount Studios.

In the 1960s he became a resident of San Jose, California.

Volz died on December 30, 1990, in San Jose, California.

Work

Exhibitions 
 1927, Berlin National Exhibition
 1937, Paris Salon
 1938–1941, San Francisco Art Association (SFAA)
 1939, Golden Gate International Exposition (GGIE)
 1942, solo exhibition at the E.B. Crocker Art Gallery in Sacramento

Memberships 
Council of Allied Arts in Los Angeles, California Watercolor Society (renamed the California National Watercolor Society in 1967)

References

External links
Oral history interview with Herman Volz, June 27, 1964 from the Archives of American Art (Smithsonian Institution)

1990 deaths
1904 births
Artists from the San Francisco Bay Area
Artists from Zürich
People from San Jose, California
Federal Art Project artists
Painters from California
American muralists
Swiss emigrants to the United States